Locheutis vagata is a moth of the family Oecophoridae. It was described by Edward Meyrick in 1916. It is found in New Zealand.

References

 Locheutis vagata in insectin

Moths described in 1916
Oecophoridae
Taxa named by Edward Meyrick
Moths of New Zealand
Endemic fauna of New Zealand
Endemic moths of New Zealand